The 2011 Cup of China was the third event of six in the 2011–12 ISU Grand Prix of Figure Skating, a senior-level international invitational competition series. It was held at the Shanghai Oriental Sports Center in Shanghai on November 3–6. Medals were awarded in the disciplines of men's singles, ladies' singles, pair skating, and ice dancing. Skaters earned points toward qualifying for the 2011–12 Grand Prix Final.

Eligibility
Skaters who reached the age of 14 by July 1, 2011 were eligible to compete on the senior Grand Prix circuit.

In July 2011, minimum score requirements were added to the Grand Prix series and were set at two-thirds of the top scores at the 2011 World Championships. Prior to competing in a Grand Prix event, skaters were required to earn the following:

Entries
The entries were as follows. Brian Joubert was assigned to the event but withdrew due to a back injury. Jinlin Guan of China also withdrew; as both skaters had withdrawn just days prior to the event, no replacements were assigned and the men's field consisted of eight skaters.

Schedule of events
(Local time, UTC +08:00):

 Thursday, November 3
 10:30–16:35 – Official practices
 Friday, November 4
 09:45–14:30 – Official practices
 15:30–16:36 – Short dance
 17:00–18:21 – Ladies' short program
 18:45–20:06 – Men's short program
 20:45–21:55 – Pairs' short program
 Saturday, November 5
 08:30–13:55 – Official practices
 14:30–15:45 – Free dance
 16:15–17:47 – Ladies' free skating
 18:15–19:52 – Men's free skating
 20:30–21:50 – Pairs' free skating
 22:00 – Medal ceremonies
 Sunday, November 6
 14:00–16:35 – Official practices
 19:00–21:30 – Exhibition

Results

Men

Ladies

Pairs

Ice dancing

References

External links

 
 Entries at the International Skating Union

Cup Of China, 2011
Cup of China
Sports competitions in Shanghai
2011 in Chinese sport